Garfinny Church is a medieval church and National Monument in County Kerry, Ireland.

Location

Description

One stone in the graveyard bears the inscription: Here lie Maurice Kennedy and his wife Judith Carrane, James Kennedy and his wife Alice Moriarty Achillon - said Maurice and James were the sons of John, son of Maurice, son of John Kennedy, who in the days of Cromwell left Nenagh in Ormond and settled in the Parish of Garfinach. This stone is consecrated to their memory by Jos. Kennedy, M.D., and the Revd. James Kennedy, P.P. of Dingle, sons of the said James, A.D. 1816. This illustrates the transfer of the O'Kennedys, among many other Irish clans and people, from Munster to Kerry during the Cromwellian land confiscations.

References

Religion in County Kerry
Archaeological sites in County Kerry
National Monuments in County Kerry
Former churches in the Republic of Ireland